Renato Olive (born 6 April 1971) is an Italian former footballer.

External links
ESPN Soccernet profile
Soccerbase profile

1971 births
Living people
People from Putignano
Italian footballers
People from Fasano
Serie A players
Serie B players
Serie C players
Vis Pesaro dal 1898 players
S.S. Fidelis Andria 1928 players
Bologna F.C. 1909 players
Parma Calcio 1913 players
S.S.C. Napoli players
Catania S.S.D. players
A.C. Perugia Calcio players
Ravenna F.C. players
Association football midfielders
Footballers from Apulia
Sportspeople from the Metropolitan City of Bari